Stefano Fabri (c. 1560 – 1609, or Fabbri, Stefano Fab(b)ri senior) was an Italian composer, organist and furthermore he was known to play the trombone. He succeeded Ruggiero Giovanelli as maestro di cappella of the Cappella Giulia at Saint Peter's Basilica in Rome.

Family and background 
He was born in Orvieto as the son of the flemish musician Franceso Fabri, who also had been his first teacher of music. His son Stefano Fabri jr. had been the teacher of Francesco Beretta - also a director of music at the Vatican.

Biography 
His career began at the cathedral of his birth place in Orvieto. First he was a singer but he also played the organ and the trombone later on. In 1599 he left his position in Orvieto to succeed Ruggiero Giovanelli but they also seem to have been Co-workers. He kept this employment until 1601. 1601-1607 he worked at the Lateran and then he advanced to be the director of music at S. Loreto. Besides his function also a director of music at the Vatican, the Lateran and S. Loreto, where he stayed until the end of his life, he also composed for S. Luigi dei Francesi and S. Maria Maggiore. His burial place is near to S. Loreto.

Works 
He was well-known as a capable couterpointist. He composed antiphones (Codice n.42, Cappella Giulia XV 62). Further examples are:
 Litaniae lauretanae
 A poco a poco more, a secular piece of music in Musica di diversi eccellentissimi musici by Angelo Gardano (1604)
As an example of his composition is to be found at the Bibliotheque nationale de France, Gallica:
 https://gallica.bnf.fr/ark:/12148/btv1b103157524.image, Tu es Petrus. Motteta à 8 [2 chori a 4 v. con organo] del sigr. Stefano Fabri, maestrodi cappella in S. Luigi di Francesi in Rom

Further reading 
 Giancarlo Rostirolla, La Cappella Giulia 1513-2013: Cinque secoli di musica sacra in San Pietro, I magistero di Stefano Fabri (1599-1601), Bärenreiter-Verlag, 10. April 2018 
Grove, George; Dictionary of Music and Musicians; London: Macmillan and Co.

Weblinks 
 https://www.treccani.it/enciclopedia/stefano-fabbri/, about Stefano F. sen.
 https://www.treccani.it/enciclopedia/stefano-iunior-fabri_(Dizionario-Biografico), concerning his son

References 

1560s births
1609 deaths
Year of birth uncertain
16th-century Italian composers
17th-century Italian composers